William John Hartack Jr. (December 9, 1932 – November 26, 2007), born in Colver, Pennsylvania, was a Hall of Fame jockey. Colver is in the northwestern part of Cambria Township, 7 miles (11 km) northwest of Ebensburg, the county seat.

Early life and career
Referred to by the media as both "Bill" and "Willie" (Hartack detested being called "Willie") during his racing career, Hartack grew up on a farm in the Blacklick Township area of Cambria County, Pennsylvania.

His mother died from injuries in an automobile accident in 1940, when Hartack was 8.

Small in stature, at age 17 he stood 5 ft. 4 in. (1.63 m) and weighed 111 lb (50 kg), a size that enabled him to pursue a career as a jockey in Thoroughbred horse racing.

By his third season of racing, Hartack was the United States' leading jockey in both wins and money earned. He would go on to win a National Champion title six times. 

He and Eddie Arcaro are the only two jockeys to ever win the Kentucky Derby five times. As well, Hartack won the Preakness Stakes three times and the Belmont Stakes once. He rode Tim Tam to victory in the 1958 Florida Derby but a week before the Kentucky Derby, Hartack broke a leg and had to give up his ride on Tim Tam to replacement jockey Ismael Valenzuela, who won the Derby.

During his riding career between 1953 and 1974 in the United States, Hartack rode 4,272 winners in 21,535 mounts. From 1974 to 1980 he raced in Hong Kong, then retired in 1981.  Hartack led the nation in races won four times, and was the first rider to have purse earnings of $3 million in a season.

After he retired as a jockey, Hartack worked as a steward as well as other racing officials for the rest of his life.

Hartack made the cover of Sports Illustrated magazine in 1956 and again in 1964, plus the cover of the 10 February 1958 issue of Time, which he always refused to sign as it showed his first name as "Willie," which he detested.

He was inducted into the National Museum of Racing and Hall of Fame in 1959 at the early age of 26.

In 1967, Hartack authored (with Whitney Tower) a three-part series in Sports Illustrated titled "A Hard Ride All The Way." Published in the March 27, April 3 & April 10 issues, the series chronicled Hartack's life and included his frequent run-ins and disputes with owners, trainers, racing officials and members of the press.

Winners ridden in Triple Crown Classic races :

 Kentucky Derby:
1957 : Iron Liege 
1960 : Venetian Way 
1962 : Decidedly 
1964 : Northern Dancer 
1969 : Majestic Prince 
 Preakness Stakes:
1956 : Fabius
1964 : Northern Dancer 
1969 : Majestic Prince 
 Belmont Stakes:
1960 : Celtic Ash

Death
On November 26, 2007, Hartack was found dead from an apparent heart attack in a cabin at a camp near the town of Freer, Texas.

Legacy
The Bill Hartack Charitable Foundation was established to honor a racing legend and icon and to continue in his name contributions to the industry he dearly loved - Thoroughbred racing. More information can be found at billhartackfoundation.com.

References

Further reading
 Christine, Bill (2016). Bill Hartack: The Bittersweet Life of a Hall of Fame Jockey. Jefferson, NC: McFarland & Company. .

Notes
 William J. Hartack at the United States' National Museum of Racing and Hall of Fame

External links
 Obituary in The Times, 2 January 2007
 ESPN Five-Derby Winner Bill Hartack Dies

1932 births
2007 deaths
People from Ebensburg, Pennsylvania
American jockeys
American Champion jockeys
United States Thoroughbred Racing Hall of Fame inductees
American horse racing announcers
American sports announcers
People from Cambria County, Pennsylvania